Phialucium is a genus of cnidarians belonging to the monotypic family Phialuciidae.

The species of this genus are found in India Ocean, Malesia, Australia.

Species:

Phialucium carolinae 
Phialucium condensum 
Phialucium mbenga 
Phialucium multitentaculatum

References

Leptothecata
Hydrozoan genera